Matthew W. Milam (born September 18, 1961) is an American Democratic Party politician, who served in the New Jersey General Assembly from January 8, 2008 to March 1, 2013. He started serving again on January 31, 2019 until January 14, 2020.

Early life 
A resident of Vineland, New Jersey, Milam served in the Assembly on the Tourism and Gaming Committee (as Vice-Chair), the Environment and Solid Waste Committee and the Transportation, Public Works and Independent Authorities Committee. Milam is a graduate of Cumberland County College, where he majored in Political Science. He is President of Foundry Service Corporation. Milam has served as chair of the Cumberland County Economic Development Board since 2005.

New Jersey Assembly 
Milam was elected to the Assembly in 2007 after Jeff Van Drew retired to join the New Jersey Senate. He was sworn in on January 8, 2008. Milam resigned from the Assembly on March 1, 2013 and was replaced with Bob Andrzejczak. In Milam’s 2019 re-election campaign he and his running mate Bruce Land lost the election to republicans Erik Simonsen and Antwan McClellan.

Return to Assembly 
After Jeff Van Drew resigned to join the United States House of Representatives in 2018 the 1st District's Assemblyman Bob Andrzejczak was appointed to fill Van Drew's seat in the Senate. Milam was chosen to fill Andrzejczak's seat on January 29, 2019. Milam was sworn into the Assembly by Speaker Craig Coughlin on January 31, 2019.

Tenure 
After Milam was sworn in on January 31, 2019 he voted against raising the states minimum wage to $15 an hour alongside Bruce Land.

Committee assignments 
Agriculture and Natural Resources
Military and Veterans' Affairs

Electoral history

New Jersey Assembly

References

External links
Assemblyman Milam's legislative web page, New Jersey Legislature (Archive from December 18, 2019)
New Jersey Legislature financial disclosure forms
2011 2010 2009 2008 2007

1961 births
Living people
Democratic Party members of the New Jersey General Assembly
People from Vineland, New Jersey
Politicians from Cumberland County, New Jersey
21st-century American politicians